José Juan Benítez Díaz (c. November 24, 1865– August 25, 1947) was a Puerto Rican businessman, entrepreneur and Unionista politician. He served as a member of the Senate of Puerto Rico from 1917 to 1924.

In 1917, Benítez Díaz was elected to the first Senate of Puerto Rico for the Union of Puerto Rico party, representing the District of Humacao. He served in that position until 1924.

After that, Benítez was the owner of Benítez Sugar Company in Vieques.

José J. Benítez Díaz died on August 25, 1947 at age 81. He was buried at Cementerio San José in San Juan, Puerto Rico.

References

1866 births
1947 deaths
Members of the Senate of Puerto Rico
People from Luquillo, Puerto Rico
Puerto Rican businesspeople